South Sterling is an unincorporated community in Dreher Township, Wayne County, Pennsylvania, United States. South Sterling is located along Pennsylvania Route 191 and the Wallenpaupack Creek, north of the intersection with Pennsylvania Route 423 and near the border with Pike County.

References

Unincorporated communities in Wayne County, Pennsylvania
Unincorporated communities in Pennsylvania